Javiera Alejandra Mena Carrasco (born June 3, 1983) is a Chilean indie electropop musician living in Lavapiés, Madrid. She started her musical career in the Chilean indie music scene in 2001, and achieved wider success after the release of her first studio album in 2006. Her musical style tends to be synthesized electronic sound, although prior to her official debut she made acoustic-oriented songs accompanied solely by guitar.

Biography
Mena began performing live at the age of 17, her first concert occurring in a classroom of Juan Gómez Millas Campus at the University of Chile. In 2002, she began to study musical composition and musical arrangement at the music academy ProJazz, while also performing at underground parties and clubs. In 2003 she recorded various demos which leaked to the internet shortly thereafter and spread by her friends. In 2004, she performed outside Chile for the first time, opening for Argentinean electropop band Entre Ríos in Buenos Aires.

Between 2003 and 2006, she was also part of the Electropop duet Prissa (formerly Tele Visa), along with her friend Francisca Villela. The group released an EP entitled Ni Tú Ni Yo.

Esquemas Juveniles
Javiera's first song officially published was “Sol de Invierno", which was included in the 2005 compilation album Panorama Neutral. Another song, “Cámara Lenta”, shortly after was included in the soundtrack of Alberto Fuguet’s movie Se arrienda. Her debut album, Esquemas Juveniles, was recorded between 2004 and 2005 and it was produced by Cristian Heyne. The album was first released in 2006 in Argentina by an indie label owned by Entre Ríos, and was released in Chile and Japan through local indie labels. Her music began to achieve attention worldwide mainly because of the internet, especially sites such as MySpace. The album was later named the second best album of the 2000s by Latin music website Club Fonograma, while its opening track "Al Siguiente Nivel" was named the best song of the decade.

In 2009, Mena performed in Europe for the first time, as being invited by Norwegian duo Kings of Convenience to be their opening act in their concerts held in Spain and Portugal.

Mena

After four years of production and mastering, Mena's second studio album, entitled Mena, was released in late 2010. This album was again produced by Cristian Heyne, and took a more dancefloor-oriented style compared to her first work, which was more of a balance between dance with mid-tempo and slow ballads. The album's first single, “Hasta la Verdad”, was listed as one of the "Singles of the Week" in the American version of the iTunes Store, and iTunes Mexico named Mena as the breakthrough album of the year. Club Fonograma gave Mena its first, and to date only, perfect 100 rating, and later named it their 2010 album of the year.

In April 2011, Mena performed live in the Chilean version of Lollapalooza. In May, she toured in Spain and performed live as one of the foreign acts of the Primavera Sound Festival in Barcelona. She was praised for her performance and got the attention of the Spanish local press.

In 2012, Mena was featured in El Guincho's single Novias.

In March 2013, Mena along with fellow countryman artist Gepe collaborated with Mexican singer-songwriter Julieta Venegas for a song entitled "Vuelve".

Otra Era

In October 2014, Javiera Mena released her third album, Otra Era. The album marks the search of the artist for a heavy 1980s disco sound, with a wider use of synthesizers and more danceable beats than her previous work. Also, this stage reflects a bigger interest in the visual aspects of her career regarding music videos and live shows. The first single released was the song "Espada" ("Sword"), released in 2013, whose video (and lyrics) became widely popular due to its references to LGBT community. The video was directed by Luis Cerveró (part of the remarkable visual collective CANADA) and has more than two million views on YouTube.

On the cover of the album Otra Era, Javiera appears in a black and white picture, wearing Eskimo sunglasses by designer André Courrèges (an item which later became an icon of Javiera) and showing full breasts. The cover was censored by the media and music and streaming services like iTunes and Spotify.

In 2015, she toured in Otra Era Tour, taking its shows to Spain, Mexico, Peru, and Chile.

In 2016, Javiera was invited to participate as a jury in the most popular music festival in Chile, The Viña Del Mar International Song Festival. She was also invited to play a show at the festival, which was broadcast on national TV and satellite international signal on A&E. Javiera arranged to make a very attractive and spectacular show for the night, including very colorful visuals, fancy garments and a set of numerous female dancers. The show was a gateway for a lot of people in the country (and in Latin America) who didn't know the work of Javiera, and the end of the show she said "I'm very happy to be here. It's very difficult to be an independent artist in Chile, and besides the numbers and sales, I make music because it comes from my soul, from my heart."

2016 marked 10 years of the career of Javiera Mena (since the release of Esquemas Juveniles), which she will be celebrating in a commemoration show in Santiago on September of the same year.

2019 Javiera Mena was invited to perform at Coachella Music Festival in Indio, CA.

In 2022, Mena participated in the inaugural edition of Benidorm Fest, Spain's national selection for the Eurovision Song Contest. She performed in the second semi-final and earned 50 points, placing 6th and failing to qualify for the final.

Artistry
Early in her career, Spanish canción melódica singer Jeanette was one of her biggest influences. While her initial music was indie pop, over the years she evolved towards an electropop sound that has come to define her modern career.

Mena is openly lesbian, which has influenced the content of her music. When asked about her "lesbian influences" in music in a 2019 interview, the singer mentioned the Argentine pop duo of Sandra Mihanovich and Celeste Carballo and their songs "Puerto Pollensa", "Soy lo que soy" and "Mujer contra mujer".

Discography
Studio albums
 Esquemas Juveniles (2006)
 Mena (2010)
 Otra Era (2014)
 Espejo (2018)
EPs

 I. Entusiasmo (2021)

Awards and nominations

Latin Grammy Awards

|-
| style="text-align:center;" | 2015
| "Otra Era"
| Best Alternative Song || 
|-

MTV Europe Music Awards

References

External links
 Official site
 Official MySpace
 Official Twitter

1983 births
Living people
21st-century Chilean women singers
Chilean women singer-songwriters
Chilean pop singers
Lesbian singers
Chilean lesbian musicians
Chilean LGBT singers
Chilean LGBT songwriters
Chilean LGBT rights activists
Lesbian songwriters
People from Santiago
Latin music songwriters
21st-century Chilean LGBT people
Women in Latin music
LGBT people in Latin music
Benidorm Fest contestants